Docs Keepin Time (1987 – March 15, 2013) was a black American Quarter Horse who portrayed Black Beauty in the 1994 film adaptation of Anna Sewell's novel. Docs Keepin Time also portrayed The Black in the American television series The Adventures of the Black Stallion.

As a 5th generation offspring of War Admiral, Docs Keepin Time produced many offspring himself. Three of his sons were Samsons Keepin Time, Starrin Doctor Sunny and Keepin Charge. Keepin Charge was featured in the 2008 movie Appaloosa starring Ed Harris and Viggo Mortensen.

Pedigree

References

External links
 

1987 racehorse births
2013 racehorse deaths
American Quarter Horse racehorses
Horses in film and television
Horse actors